This is a list of number-one hits in Slovakia by year from the Rádio Top 100 Oficiálna chart which is compiled weekly by IFPI Czech Republic on a weekly basis since the cancellation of the Slovak national section (SNS IFPI) on December 31, 2009.

2000s
2010s
2020s

References